Separatism in Russia refers to bids for secession or autonomy for certain areas of the Russian Federation. There are several separatist movements in Russia, but promoting separatism is illegal.

Major movements 
Many separatist movements in Russia have existed before the collapse of the Soviet Union and have some support from the local elites and people. Some have risen to relevance after the 2022-2023 Russian invasion of Ukraine.

Northwestern Federal District 
The main groups pushing for autonomy and separatism within the Northwestern Federal District are Finno-Ugric peoples, but other civic nationalist movements are also prominent in the region. The movements are mainly located in the Kaliningrad, Leningrad and Arkhangelsk Oblasts, as well as in the Karelian and Komi Republics.

 The Baltic Republic (or Land of Amber/Yantarny Krai) is a proposed state within the borders of Kaliningrad Oblast. The idea was mainly supported by the Baltic Republican Party which was dissolved in 2005. Currently, the idea is supported by Kaliningrad Public Movement, which is represented on the Free Nations of Russia Forum, and the Respublika movement. Baltic separatists support decommunization and the use of German city names.

In 2022, the Governor of Kaliningrad Oblast said that there was an attempt to create a “German autonomy” in Kaliningrad by western agents to destabilize the region.

 Ingermanland or Ingria is a proposed state within the borders of Leningrad Oblast and the city of Saint Petersburg. Ingrian separatism began with Viktor Bezverkhy in the 1970s and 80s, but the concept only gained relative popularity in 1996 with the creation of the Movement for Autonomy of Petersburg and the Independent Petersburg movement. Currently, the idea is supported by the “Free Ingria” movement and "Ingria Without Borders" movement, which are represented in the Free Nations of Russia Forum. The main supporters of Ingermanland are Russians unhappy with the nation's centralisation, although in recent times "various groups and movements of Ingria supporters" do not support complete Ingrian independence, while some movements still advocate for full independence. Ethnic Finns have unsuccessfully requested the movement to stop using their ethnic flag.

In 2022, Russian rapper Oxxxymiron mentioned Ingria in his anti-war song Oyda in which he says “Ingria will be free”.

The idea saw a revival in the 90s and early 2000s due to the unofficial status of the Karelian language in Karelia and the Russian economic collapse of 1991–92. The first attempt to break away was in 1992, when Sergei Popov, a member of the Supreme Council of the Republic proposed to include in the agenda the question of the possibility of secession of the Republic of Karelia from the Russian Federation. He was supported by 43 deputies out of 109. The main Karelian separatist organization in the 2010s was the Republican Movement of Karelia, which was legally dissolved in 2019: despite this, its founder, claims the organization is still active. Shtepa also affirms that before and during the dissolution of the Soviet Union there was a popular front in Karelia similar to the Popular Fronts of Estonia, Latvia and Lithuania, but this claim is unverified. In 2015, a trial began against Vladimir Zavarkin, a deputy of the city council of Suojärvi, who was accused of supporting separatism.

The idea of Karelian separatism is currently supported by the Republican Movement of Karelia and the Karelian National Movement. The Karelian National Movementis represented on the Free Nations of Russia Forum. The main difference between the movements lies in their treatment towards ethnic Russians and other non-Finno-Ugric peoples. The Republican Movement of Karelia supports the idea of a multiethnic state based on civic nationalism, while the Karelian National Movement opposes Russians and other non-Finno-Ugric peoples involving themselves in Karelian separatist movements and supports creation of an ethnostate.

In 2023, the Karelian National Movement started to organize a Karelian battalion of the Ukrainian Armed Forces.

 Komi separatism primarily focuses on the preservation of Komi culture, language, and local ecology. Many cultural and language movements, such as Doryam asymös, have been labeled separatist by authorities and some of the members arrested. Komi separatists are represented on the Free Nations of Russia Forum.

 Pomorie is a proposed state within the borders of Arkhangelsk Oblast, some movements also include Murmansk Oblast and Nenets Autonomous Okrug as part of a proposed state. The Pomor Institute of Native Peoples supported the idea of a Pomor Republic. The name comes from the Pomor people, who historically inhabited the White Sea coast and Arkhangelsk Oblast. Most Pomor separatists focus on preservation of local culture and maintaining the ecological situation in the region. Many Pomor cultural movements have been labeled as separatist for “disuniting Russian culture”. The former Governor of Arkhangelsk Oblast Anatoly Yefremov considered himself a Pomor.  In 2013, a Pomor human rights activist Ivan Moseev who worked in NArFU university in Arkhangelsk was accused of inciting hatred against ethnic Russians for his comment on the Internet. He was put on the Russian list of terrorists and extremists. In 2022, the ECHR recognized the case as an infringement of the freedom of speech and awarded him a payment of 8,800 euros.

In addition, the Pomor movement was periodically accused of links with Norwegian government and NATO. It is known that the father of NATO's Secretary General Thorvald Stoltenberg was an honorary member of the international Pomor organization "Pomor Brotherhood".

Southern Federal District 
Separatism in the Southern Federal District is primarily ethnic but some civic nationalist movements are also active. The movements are mainly located in Astrakhan Oblast, Crimea, Krasnodar Krai and Kalmykia. Some political commentators believe that separatism in that region is founded by Ukraine.

 Astrakhan separatism may refer to the idea of uniting with Kalmykia as an independent state or a creation of an independent Astrakhan Republic or Nogai Republic. Much of the territory of modern-day Astrakhan Oblast used to belong to the Kalmyk ASSR until the deportation of Kalmyk people. Currently those former territories, and the entire Oblast in some cases, are claimed by most Kalmyk separatist movements. Other ethnic minorities, such as Kazakhs, Tatars and Nogais, and Russians suggested creating an Independent multinational republic.

  Cossack separatism originates during the Russian Civil War with the proclamation of Almighty Don Host existing from 1918 to 1920. Among a number of Cossack emigrants, the ideas of Cossack nationalism were widespread. Since the collapse of the USSR, several attempts have been made to revive the Don Republic. The Don Cossack Republic was proclaimed in the fall of 1991 and became part of the Union of Cossack Republics of Southern Russia, which planned to become one of the union republics. In March 1993, the Great Cossack circle of the Don approved an act on the transformation of the Rostov region into a state-territorial entity «Region of the Don Host Oblast».

Don Cossack separatists seeking the creation of the state of Cossackia are represented on the Free Nations of Russia Forum.

 Kalmyk separatism seeks the creation of an independent Kalmyk state and unification with Astrakhan Oblast. The biggest movement is the Oirat-Kalmyk People's Congress, which is represented on the Free Nations of Russia Forum. Promotion of Kalmyk culture has been viewed as separatism by central authorities.

In 2022 Shajin Lama (the spiritual leader of Kalmyk Buddhists) of Kalmykia denounced the Russian invasion of Ukraine.

 Kuban separatism or Kuban Cossack separatism originates during the Russian Civil War with the proclamation of Kuban People's Republic. The idea saw revival in the 90s and early 2000s due to revitalization of the Cossack culture. The majority of Kuban separatists identify as Cossack, and, due to subsidization of many Cossack cultural movements, more and more people in Kuban identify as Cossack. In 2017 Kuban Liberation Movement proclaimed independence of Kuban People's Republic, but the stunt received no recognition. Some Russian political commentators believe that Kuban separatism is being founded and supported by Ukraine.

Kuban separatists are represented on the Free Nations of Russia Forum.

North Caucasian Federal District 
Separatism in North Caucasian Federal District is primarily ethnic. Almost all of the republics have an active separatist movement. The movements have large support among diaspora.

 Caucasus Emirate was a radical movement to create an Islamic state on the territory of North Caucasian Federal District and Stavropol Krai. The group was active from 2007 to 2015, when most of the remaining forces joined in with the Islamic State.

 Chechen separatism dates all the way back to the 1800s and the Caucasus war. Modern Chechen separatism began with the declaration of independence of the Chechen Republic of Ichkeria. After two wars Chechnya was reincorporated into the Russian Federation. After the war an insurgency movement to restore Chechen independence was started.

The government of Ichkeria is currently in exile. Ichkeria was recognized as “temporarily occupied” by Ukrainian parliament in 2022. Currently there are Chechen volunteers fighting for the Ukrainian army with the goal to restore independence. Other Chechen separatist movements, such as Adat People's Movement, operate independently from Ichkerian government. Chechen separatists are represented on the Free Nations of Russia Forum.

 The Confederation of Mountain Peoples of the Caucasus (or Confederation of Peoples of the Caucasus) is a proposed state within the borders of Russia's Caucasian republics, South Ossetia and Abkhazia. The symbols used by the separatists are based on symbols of The Mountainous Republic of the Northern Caucasus. The main movement of the separatists is the Confederation of Peoples of the Caucasus, a paramilitary organization that fought in Chechnya, Abkhazia and South Ossetia. The organization became inactive after its leader, Yusup Soslambekov, was assassinated in 2002.

The idea of a unified Caucasian Republic is also supported by other movements.

 Circassia is proposed state that covers the land which was historically inhabited by Circassian people, such as Adygeya (Part of Southern Federal District), north Kabardino-Balkaria, north Karachay–Cherkessia, south-east Krasnodar Krai, and south Stavropol Krai. The independence of Circassia has some support in the republics, but most of the support comes from the Circassian diaspora and International Circassian Association. After the independence of Abkhazia and South Ossetia the separatism in Circassian regions started to grow. Circassian separatists are represented on the Free Nations of Russia Forum.

Circassian nationalists protested the 2014 Sochi Olympiad due to the fact that Sochi used to be a Circassian city before the Circassian genocide.

 Dagestan separatism can refer to the idea of an independent united Dagestan or disunited independent states, such as Aghulistan, Avaria, Lezgistan, Darginstan, Lakistan, Rutulstan and Tabarasanstan. Proponents of a united Dagestan want to create a multiethnic state. Some of the local separatist movements have been represented in the UNPO.

In 1999 the Islamic International Peacekeeping Brigade invaded the Republic with an intent to create an Islamic state.

 Ingush separatism has been growing after the collapse of the Soviet Union due to the fact that the borders between Chechnya, Alania and Ingushetia have not been decided upon. Some separatists suggested that Ingushetia should unite with Georgia.

Ingush separatists are represented on the Free Nations of Russia Forum.

 Alanian (or Ossetian) separatism refers to the movement to create an independent united Ossetian nation by uniting with South Ossetia.

Volga Federal District 
Separatism in Volga Federal District is primarily ethnic. All the republics have an active separatist movement.

 Modern Bashkir separatism began in the 90s and was influenced by Tatarstan. Just like most other movements, Bashkir separatism continued to grow in the early 2000s and even got some support from the local government. In 2020, separatists joined the protests against the occupation of Kushtau mountain. Some Bashkir separatists, such as the Bashkort movement and Bashkir National-Political Center of Lithuania, support a creation of a multiethnic state for both Bashkirs and Russians. But some separatists support a creation of an ethnostate. Bashkir separatists represented on the Free Nations of Russia Forum.

After the Russian Invasion of Ukraine, there have been reports of armed resistance in Bashkortostan.

 Chuvash separatism focuses on the preservation of Chuvash language of culture and the creation of an independent Chuvash Republic or Volga Bulgaria. The main organizations are the Union of Chuvash local historians, Suvar movement, Chuvash National Congress.

Chuvash paganists were criticized by the Russian Orthodox Church for being separatists.

 Erzyan Mastor (Land of Erzya) is a proposed state by the Erzya National Congress. The movement claimed the territories of Republic of Mordovia, Penza, Ulyanovsk, Nizhny Novgorod, Ryazan and Samara Oblasts. The movement wants to create a federative state with a Moksha autonomy.

The movement is represented on the Free Nations of Russia Forum.

 The idea of a unified Idel-Ural began during the Russian Civil War with the creation of the Idel-Ural State. The name was later used by the Idel-Ural Legion of Nazi Germany during the invasion of the Soviet Union.

The main movement of modern Idel-Ural separatists is the Free Idel-Ural movement, which was registered in 2018 in Kyiv. The movement wants to create a multiethnic federal state. Free Idel-Ural movement is represented on the Free Nations of Russia Forum.

 Modern Mari separatism began with the collapse of the USSR, compared to other ASSRs, 43,8% of regional leaders said that the dissolution was needed, which was higher than national average. The biggest political organization of Mari separatists is Mari Ushem, which is over 100 years old. Other movements include Kugeze mlande, a far-right separatist organization, Mari Mer Kagash, and the Association of Finno-Ugric Peoples. Mari paganists were also criticized by the Russian Orthodox Church for being separatists.

 Komi-Permyak or Permyak separatism refers of the idea of recreating Komi-Permyak Autonomous Okrug within the borders of Komi-Permyak Okrug of Perm Krai. Komi-Permyakia became the first autonomous okrug of Russia that voted to join another federal subject. The primary cause of separatism is destruction of local culture and language and economic dependency on Perm. Local politicians and people believe that the Perm government has failed to modernize the region, as it still remains one of the poorest parts of Perm Krai.

 Modern Tatar separatism began in 1990, when Tatar ASSR declared its sovereignty from the USSR and the RSFSR. On October 18, 1991, the Republic of Tatarstan declared its full independence. In 1992 an independence referendum was held, in which more than 50% voted for full independence from Russia. In 1994 Tatarstan unified with Russia as an associated state, this agreement ended in 2017. In 2021 the government of Tatarstan refused to change the title of its president to the head of the republic, which was interpreted by some political commentators as separatism.

Many political scientists and commentators believe that Tatarstan is the leading separatist force in modern Russia and an example for other movements. The main Tatar separatist movements are All-Tatar Public Center and the Ittifaq Party. They are represented on the Free Nations of Russia Forum.

Annually, Tatar separatists protest Moscow's 1552 capture of Kazan.

 Udmurt separatism focuses on protection of local culture, language and the creation of an Udmurt state. Udmurt separatism is supported by various Finno-Ugric organizations. The main organizations are Congress of Peoples of Udmurtia and Udmurt Kenesh movement. Many ethnic Udmurts were not allowed to have seats in local parliaments due to fears that they might cause more separatism in the republic.

In 2019, Udmurt linguist and activist Albert Razin committed self-immolation due to Russia's new laws on its native languages. He became a symbol of Udmurt separatists and activists.

Ural Federal District 
Separatism in the Ural Federal District is primarily represented by the Ural Republic separatists.

 The Ural Republic is proposed state within the border of Sverdlovsk, Chelyabinsk, Kurgan and Orenburg Oblasts and Perm Krai. Originally the idea was suggested by the Governor of Sverdlovsk Oblast in 1992, but it was not separatist in nature. The main movements are the Ural Republic Movement, Free Ural and The Ural Democratic foundation. In 2019, Ural separatists participated in protests against the constriction of a church in Ekaterinburg city center.

In 2022, Russian TV personality and propagandist Vladimir Solovyov proclaimed that Yekaterinburg is “the center of such vile liberals, which has given rise to many scum, now hiding abroad”. He also blamed the current Governor of Sverdlovsk Oblast Yevgeny Kuyvashev for separatism.

Siberian Federal District 
Separatism in the Siberian Federal District is primarily represented by the Siberian separatists and ethnic separatists in the republics.

 Siberian separatism originates from the  movement of the Russian Civil War. Modern Siberian separatism began in the 90s, when Aman Tuleev suggested creating a Siberian Republic as an autonomous subject of the Russian Federation.

There are many Siberian regionalist movements, but the largest one was the March for Federalization of Siberia in 2014. The movement also coined the phrase “Stop feeding Moscow!”, which is now used by other separatists.

Siberian separatists are represented on the Free Nations of Russia Forum.

 Taymyr separatism or Dolgano-Nenets separatism refers to the idea of recreating Taymyr Autonomous Okrug within the borders of Taymyrsky Dolgano-Nenetsky District of Krasnoyarsk Krai. The idea is supported by the local population and there have been more than 4 attempts to orgnanize a referendum to leave Krasnoyarsk Krai. The main causes of separatism are economic exploitation by Krasnoyarsk, geographic isolation, poverty and lack of basic inftrastructure, such as roads, school and cemeteries. The economic situation is so bad that some villages resorted to use barter economy due to lack of food and money. Taymyr separatists do not seek independence.

 Tuvan separatism was at its strongest in the early 2000s, when various movements such as Free Tuva protested the new Tuvan constitution. The first modern Tuvan separatist organizations began in the 80s, with the creation of the Kaadyr-ool Bichildea movement. Other separatist organizations of pre-2000s include the People's Party of Sovereign Tuva and People's Front of Tuva.

Tuvan separatism is aided by the fact that Tuva is one of the poorest regions of Russia, and ethnic Russians are a very small minority in the Republic.

Far Eastern Federal District 
Separatism in the Far Eastern Federal District is primarily pushed for by Buryats, and Russians concerned about economic dependence on Moscow or economic exploitation.

 Buryat separatism may refer either to the idea of an independent Buryat state or the idea of Buryatia uniting with Mongolia. The biggest Buryat separatist movement is the Free Buryatia Foundation, which is represented on the Free Nations of Russia Forum. There have been reports of Buryat separatists attacking ethnic Russians.

 The Far Eastern Republic is a proposed state within the border of the entire Far Eastern Federal District, excluding Sakha and Buryatia. The separatists see the proposed republic as the continuation of the Far Eastern Republic. The idea of an autonomous republic was supported by the former Governor of Khabarovsk Krai Viktor Ishayev. The biggest current movement is the Far Eastern Alternative which participated in various anti government protests. Other movements such as the Far Eastern Republican Party also existed. During the 2020–2021 Khabarovsk Krai protests, some people advocated for the independence of Khabarovsk Krai. Far Eastern separatism is primarily caused by economic dependence on Moscow.

 Koryak separatism refers to the idea of recreating the Koryak Autonomous Okrug within the border of current Koryak Okrug of Kamchatka Krai. The idea gained big support among the local population in 2020, when the governor of Kamchatka, Vladimir Solodov, wanted to liqudate the existing autonomy of Koryakia by uniting it with another okrug. Other reasons include poverty and geographic isolation. Koryak separatists do not seek independence.

The biggest movements are "Koryakia" and "Palanken Ynet".

 Sakha or Yakut separatism seeks the creation of an independent Yakutian state. The primary cause of Yakut separatism is economic exploitation by the federal government. Some journalists and politicians suggested that Turkey supports Sakha separatism financially and politically.

The biggest movement is the Free Yakutia Movement, which is represented on the Free Nations of Russia Forum.

Minor movements 
Many smaller separatist movements have also existed in Russia. The majority of said movements have had little to no support from the local elite. Many of them were founded after Russia's invasion of Ukraine in 2022.

 Abazinia

 People: Abazinians
 Geography: Abazinia
 Type of movement: Autonomist
 Representation on the Free Nations of Russia Forum: No
 Years of activity: 2010s
 Agin-Buryat Autonomous Okrug
People: Buryats
 Geography: Agin-Buryat Okrug
 Group: Erhe Movement
 Type of movement: Autonomist
 Representation on the Free Nations of Russia Forum: No
 Years of activity: 2008 – Present

 Altai

People: Altai people
Geography: Altai Republic
 Type of movement: Secessionist 
 Representation on the Free Nations of Russia Forum: No

 Evenkia

People: Evenks
Geography: Evenkiysky District
Group: Association of Indigenous peoples of Evenkia "Arun"
 Type of movement: Autonomist
 Representation on the Free Nations of Russia Forum: No
 Years of activity: 2006 – Present

 Murmansk/Lapland/Sami Republic

 People: Russians, Samis
 Geography: Murmansk Oblast
 Type of movement: Secessionist
 Representation on the Free Nations of Russia Forum: Yes
 North Russian Republic

 People: Russians
 Geography: North-Western Federal District
 Group: North Russian Republic
 Type of movement: Secessionist
 Representation on the Free Nations of Russia Forum: No
 Years of activity: 2000s  – ???
 Pskov Republic or Krivia

 People: Russians
 Geography: Pskov Oblast
 Group: Krivian Platform
 Type of movement: Secessionist
 Representation on the Free Nations of Russia Forum: Yes

 Sakhalin

People: Russians
 Geography: Sakhalin Oblast
 Type of movement: Secessionist
 Representation on the Free Nations of Russia Forum: No

 Smalandia

 People: Russians, Belarussians
 Geography: Smolensk Oblast
 Group: Smalandia
 Type of movement: Secessionist
 Representation on the Free Nations of Russia Forum: Yes
 Years of activity: 2022 – Present

 Tver Karelia

People: Tver Karelians
 Geography: Tver Karelia
 Group: Karelian Revival, Tver Karelia
 Type of movement: Autonomist
 Representation on the Free Nations of Russia Forum: No
 Years of activity: ??? – Present

 Ust-Orda Buryat Autonomous Okrug

People: Buryats
 Geography: Ust-Orda Buryat Okrug
 Group: Erhe Movement
 Type of movement: Autonomist
 Representation on the Free Nations of Russia Forum: No
 Years of activity: 2008 – Present

 Veps National Volost

 People: Vepsians
 Geography: Former Veps National Volost
 Group: Karelian Congress, Veps Culture Society
 Type of movement: Autonomist
 Representation on the Free Nations of Russia Forum: No
 Years of activity: 2005 – Present
 Zalessian Rus’

 People: Russians
 Geography: Central Federal District
 Group: Committee of National Democrats, National Democratic Alliance 
 Type of movement: Secessionist and Autonomist
 Representation on the Free Nations of Russia Forum: No
 Years of activity: 2000s – Late 2010s

References

External links

Separatism in Russia
Dissolutions of countries
Public policy proposals
Partition (politics)
Lists of active separatist movements
Ethnicity in politics
Regionalism (politics)
Russian people by ethnic or national origin
Political movements in Russia
Separatism
Politics of Russia
Russian nationalism
Proposed countries